Brutalichnus is an ichnogenus. A Case Study from the Miocene of the Czech Republic found that Brutalichnus and two other Ichnogenera have evidence of biting and gnawing traces on Reptilian and Mammalian bones. Brutalichnus contains one ichnospecies, Brutalichnus brutalis. The ichnogenera Machichnus and Nihilichnus were described in the same paper.

See also
 Ichnology

References 

Trace fossils